A list of administrators of the British protectorate of Brunei.

History 

Brunei became a British protectorate in 1888, and in 1906 a British resident was given administrative authority. The sultan was obligated to follow this person's advise. Despite having a foreign government, Brunei's importance started to rise again in 1929 when petroleum production began. In place of Malay customs, traditions, and Islam, the British administration designated a British Resident to serve as the sultan's advisor in all other affairs. A formal constitution was formed by the 1959 Agreement, giving Brunei internal autonomy.

In fact, had it not been for the British Government's reluctant intervention at this point, James Brooke would have completely engulfed the Sultanate. In order to preserve the Monarchy, Sultan Hashim requested the British assistance in the internal administration of his nation. He agreed to receive a British officer, to be called the Resident, who opinions was to be received and acted upon on all matters under the Anglo-Brunei Treaty of 1905-1906. Up until 1959, successive Residents who had been originally seconded from the Malayan Civil Service (M.C.S.) were in charge of running Brunei.

List of administrators

See also

 List of High Commissioners of the United Kingdom to Brunei

References

External links
 
 

 
Brunei
Brunei